Eduardo Santos Queiroz (born 07 January 2000), known as Du Queiroz, is a Brazilian footballer who plays as a midfielder for Corinthians.

Club career
Born in São Paulo, Du Queiroz joined Corinthians' youth setup in 2013, aged 13. He made his first team – and Série A – debut on 22 August 2021, coming on as a first-half substitute for injured Fagner in a 1–0 away win over Athletico Paranaense.

On 14 October 2021, Du Queiroz renewed his contract until December 2024.

In January 2023, Du Queiroz agreed to join Russian Premier League club Zenit Saint Petersburg on a five-year deal from the summer of 2023.

Honours

Individual
 Bola de Prata Best Newcomer: 2022

Career statistics

References

External links

Corinthians profile 

2000 births
Living people
Footballers from São Paulo
Brazilian footballers
Association football midfielders
Campeonato Brasileiro Série A players
Sport Club Corinthians Paulista players
FC Zenit Saint Petersburg players